WMOW (channel 4) is a television station licensed to Crandon, Wisconsin, United States, affiliated with ABC. It is a full-time satellite of Wausau-licensed WAOW (channel 9) which is owned by Allen Media Broadcasting. WMOW's transmitter is located just east of downtown Crandon; its parent station maintains studios on Grand Avenue/US 51 in Wausau. Besides the transmitter, WMOW does not maintain any physical presence locally in Crandon.

History
Founded December 4, 1998, the station first signed-on February 9, 2001, as WBIJ. It was a FamilyNet affiliate owned by Dennis Selenka. The station aired an analog signal on VHF channel 4. Since WBIJ was granted its construction permit after the finalization of the Federal Communications Commission (FCC) digital television allotment plan on April 21, 1997, it did not receive a companion digital channel.

After Dennis Selenka's death on September 30, 2008, Quincy Newspapers purchased WBIJ from his widow for $1.5 million on February 13, 2009. The company announced its intention to run WBIJ as a second satellite station of WAOW to serve the northeast portion of the Wausau market in a similar capacity that WYOW does for the extreme northern part of the market. In the meantime, WBIJ signed off on June 12 at the end of the digital transition for full-service stations as it did not yet have digital facilities ready.

Quincy brought the station back on-the-air as WMOW on June 4, 2010, as an affiliate of The CW. This station operates its digital signal on VHF channel 12 which was the former analog home of NBC affiliate WJFW-TV.

On June 19, 2011, WAOW (and in turn WMOW-DT2) became the market's second television outlet to upgrade local news to high definition level. Included in the change was a redesigned set and updated graphics scheme.

Sale to Allen Media Group
On January 7, 2021, Quincy Media announced that it had put itself up for sale.  On February 1, Gray Television announced it would purchase Quincy's radio and TV properties for $925 million. As Gray already own's WSAW-TV in the Wausau/Rhinelander market, and both that station and WAOW rank among the market's top four stations, it agreed to sell WAOW in order to satisfy FCC requirements.

On April 29, Gray announced that WMOW and WAOW would be divested to Allen Media Group, a subsidiary of Los Angeles–based Entertainment Studios, in a $380 million deal that includes, among other Quincy-owned stations, WKOW/Madison, WXOW/La Crosse, and WQOW/Eau Claire. The deal closed in August 2021, and did not see Gray have any direct ownership or control of those stations. Gray, however, kept WYOW, which later turned into a full-power satellite of WSAW.

Subchannels
The station's digital signal is multiplexed:

References

External links
WAOW official website

Television channels and stations established in 1998
1998 establishments in Wisconsin
ABC network affiliates
Decades (TV network) affiliates
Court TV affiliates
True Crime Network affiliates
Entertainment Studios
MOW